Non Stanford (born 8 January 1989) is a British former professional triathlete, representing Great Britain and Wales at international level. Stanford was the ITU (now World Triathlon) World Champion in 2013, part of the Great Britain world champion mixed relay team in 2012 and represented Team GB at the 2016 Olympic Games in Rio de Janeiro, where she finished fourth behind teammate and housemate Vicky Holland.  In her final year of competition, 2022, she anchored Wales to silver in the team event at the 2022 Commonwealth Games, her first Commonwealth medal and her first major championship medal since 2015 World Triathlon mixed relay bronze. One week later, in her final major Olympic distance triathlon race, Stanford won her first European championship.

Non Stanford is based in Leeds, England and was born in Bridgend, Wales. Non is a Welsh name, and refers to Saint Non.

Personal life
Stanford was born in Bridgend, but grew up in nearby Swansea. Her first club was Swansea Harriers. Stanford graduated from the University of Birmingham with a degree in Sport and Exercises Sciences in 2010.

Career
Stanford was a successful cross country runner; she was Welsh Schools 1,500m champion in 2002, 2003 and 2004. Stanford was picked out as a bright young running talent in 2004 when she was invited to join Kelly Holmes on the first ever 'On Camp with Kelly' in South Africa. In 2006, she finished 3rd in the 3000m (senior) at the AAA Indoor championships. Stanford started studying Sport and Exercises Sciences at the University of Birmingham and in summer 2008 joined the university's triathlon club, changing her focus from running to triathlon after a series of injuries kept her off the track.

In the 2009 British Triathlon Super Series she came second, and in 2009/10 was awarded the 'Paul Weston Triathlon Scholarship' to concentrate on triathlon. After graduating in 2010, she won a bronze medal at the Brasschaat ITU Triathlon Premium European Cup. In the same year Stanford also took part in the prestigious French Club Championship Series Lyonnaise des Eaux and represented Montpellier Agglo Tri. Her current French Grand Prix team is the TCG 79 Parthenay team.

Stanford relocated to the British Triathlon base at Leeds Beckett University at the Leeds Triathlon Centre. The 2012 season was a breakthrough year for her as she won senior gold in the Stockholm ITU Triathlon Mixed Relay World Championships and U23 gold at the Barfoot and Thompson World Triathlon Grand Final Auckland. The 2013 season started with a win at ITU World Triathlon Madrid, before going on to take the title of ITU World Champion at the ITU World Triathlon Grand Final London. That season Stanford also achieved silver medals at the ITU World Triathlon San Diego, ITU World Triathlon Hamburg and ITU World Triathlon Stockholm.

Due to injury, Stanford's entire 2014 season was missed, but she came back strongly in 2015 to finish 2nd at both the Rio Olympic Test Event and the ITU World Triathlon Grand Final Chicago – securing Olympic selection in the process. 2016 started successfully for Stanford, as she opened her season with a win at ITU World Triathlon Cape Town. Competing in her first Olympics in Rio August 2016, she finished in 4th place. Stanford joined ECS Triathlon club in 2016. 2017 was again affected by injury, but she did achieve a win at Chengdu ITU Triathlon World Cup.

The 2018 season saw Stanford win two silver medals at the Cape Town ITU Triathlon World Cup and ITU World Triathlon Mixed Relay Series Nottingham. She also secured a bronze medal at the ITU World Triathlon Yokohama. Stanford also captained Team Wales at the 2018 Gold Coast Commonwealth Games.

In 2019 Stanford left the Brownlee Centre in Leeds and joined an international group of elite triathletes under coach Joel Filliol. The season saw her win gold at the 2019 Hamburg Wasser World Triathlon. At the end of 2019 Stanford underwent knee surgery to remove damaged cartilage.

She competed at the 2022 Commonwealth Games where she came 6th in the women's event. After winning a silver medal for Wales in the mixed triathlon relay at the same Games, she went on to win the Europe Triathlon Championships, and announced her retirement.

Stanford accepted a coaching role at the Leeds headquarters of British Triathlon to follow her retirement from elite competition

Palmares 

The following is a list of podium finishes in World Triathlon Series, WTS Mixed Relay Series and championship events. 
Results in Bold represent Championship races or overall positions

Notes

External links 
 
 Non Stanford at British Triathlon
 
 
 
 
 

1989 births
Living people
Sportspeople from Swansea
Alumni of the University of Birmingham
Welsh female triathletes
Triathletes at the 2016 Summer Olympics
Olympic triathletes of Great Britain
Triathletes at the 2018 Commonwealth Games
Triathletes at the 2022 Commonwealth Games
Commonwealth Games medallists in triathlon
Commonwealth Games silver medallists for Wales
Welsh expatriate sportspeople in France
Medallists at the 2022 Commonwealth Games